Flynn Berry is an American writer. She is most widely known for her book Under the Harrow.

Early life
Berry attended The Masters School before matriculating to Brown University. She then studied writing at the Michener Center for Writers.

Career
In 2016, Berry published Under the Harrow, a mystery novel about a woman's murder in a sleepy English town and the effects of the murder upon her sister. The book received universally positive reviews. It also won the 2017 Edgar Award for Best First Novel. In 2018, Berry published A Double Life based on the murder of Sandra Rivett and the subsequent disappearance of Lord Lucan. In 2021, Berry published Northern Spy.

Books
Under the Harrow. Penguin Books. 2016.
A Double Life. Viking. 2018.
Northern Spy: A Novel. Viking. 2021.

Notes

External links
 Author Website

Year of birth missing (living people)
Living people
American women novelists
21st-century American women writers
21st-century American novelists
American mystery writers
Michener Center for Writers alumni
Brown University alumni